Brockton Public Schools (BPS) is the school district of Brockton, Massachusetts, United States. The Brockton Public Schools is the fifth largest school district in the Commonwealth of Massachusetts and proudly serves among the most diverse student populations in the state.

History
BPS has been at the forefront of the fight for equity in education. In 1993, the landmark McDuffy v. the Secretary of the Executive Office of Education in which Brockton student Jami McDuffy was the plaintiff pushed the state toward the passage of the Education Reform Act. 

Nearly 25 years later, the district once again called on the state to fix its funding formula for Chapter 70 citing a significant drop in funding due to how the state calculates aid for low-income students. Advocacy by BPS staff, students and families working alongside education activists statewide led to the passage of the Student Opportunity Act (SOA). The SOA, signed into law on November 26, 2019, will infuse $1.5 billion into school districts, particularly districts with a higher proportion of low-income students, over the next seven years.

Demographics
The district considers its diversity to be one of its greatest assets. Brockton students proudly represent 47 countries of origin, including Afghanistan, Bangladesh, China, Greece, the Netherlands, and Venezuela. Brockton students’ most prevalent countries of origin are Cape Verde, Haiti, Brazil and Ecuador. Eighty four percent of Brockton’s students are students of color.

Collectively, Brockton students speak 38 languages, including Armenian, Amharic, Bengali, Ibo, Twi and Yoruba. The most prevalent languages spoken are Cape Verdean Creole, Haitian Creole, Spanish and Portuguese.

English is a second language for nearly half (44.3 percent) of Brockton students. The district educates 4,193 English Language Learners.

Schools

Brockton is home to the largest high school and the only K-5 global studies school in the Commonwealth of Massachusetts.

High schools
 Brockton High School

K-8 schools
Davis K-8 School

Middle schools
Ashfield Middle School
East Middle School
North Middle School
Plouffe Academy
South Middle School
West Middle School

Primary schools
Angelo School
Arnone School
Baker School  
Brookfield School
Downey School
Manthala George Jr. Global Studies School
Gilmore School
Hancock School
Kennedy School
Raymond School

Early childhood centers
 Barrett Russell Early Childhood Center

Alternative schools
 Brockton Champion High School 
 Edison Academy at Brockton High School
 Frederick Douglass Academy
 Huntington Therapeutic School

Virtual schools
 The Brockton Virtual Learning Academy (Launched in Fall 2021)

References

External links

 Brockton Public Schools

Brockton, Massachusetts
School districts in Massachusetts
Education in Plymouth County, Massachusetts